Compaoré is a surname. Notable people with the surname include:

Bassirou Compaoré (born 1998), Burkinabé football striker
Benjamin Compaoré (born 1987), French triple jumper
Blaise Compaoré (born 1951), Burkinabé politician, President of Burkina Faso
Chantal Compaoré (born 1962), First Lady of Burkina Faso, wife of Blaise
Daouda Compaoré (born 1973), Burkinabé football goalkeeper
Djibril Compaoré (born 1983), Burkinabé football striker
François Compaoré (born 1954), Burkinabé politician
Issouf Compaoré (born 1988), Burkinabé football defender
Simon Compaoré (born 1952), Burkinabé politician